Shane Sikora (born 11 March 1977) is a former Australian rules footballer who played with the West Coast Eagles in the Australian Football League (AFL).

West Coast recruited the Murray Bushrangers player with the 12th selection of the 1994 AFL draft, which they had received from Collingwood for Lee Walker. A wingman, he did not make his AFL debut until late in the 1996 season, against Essendon at Subiaco, in which he kicked two behinds and had eight disposals. He played again the following week but had to wait almost two years to make his third appearance, instead spending most of his time with Perth in the WAFL.

References

External links
 
 

1977 births
West Coast Eagles players
Perth Football Club players
Living people
Australian rules footballers from Victoria (Australia)
Murray Bushrangers players
Carey Park Football Club players